Drobeta-Turnu Severin, colloquially Severin, is a city in Mehedinți County, Oltenia, Romania, on the northern bank of the Danube, close to the Iron Gates. "Drobeta" is the name of the ancient Dacian and Roman towns at the site, and the modern town of Turnu Severin received the additional name of Drobeta during Nicolae Ceaușescu's national-communist dictatorship as part of his myth-making efforts.

The city administers three villages: Dudașu Schelei, Gura Văii, and Schela Cladovei. The city's population is 92,617 (2011), up from 18,628 in 1900.

Etymology

Drobeta
Drobeta was a Dacian town. The Roman castrum built by Emperor Trajan at the site preserved the Dacian name (see "History" section). According to Hamp and Hyllested, Drobeta reflects a roman misinterpretation of *Druwā-tā (the wooden place) with a postposed article, reflecting an old Albanian syntag for wood druwa-tai

Severin
The city's name was originally linked by historians with the Roman Emperor Septimius Severus, during whose reign the name of the city was Drobeta Septimia Severiana. However, the name may be derived from Old Church Slavonic severno ("northern"), from sěverъ, "north".

Another possibility is that Severin's name was taken in memory of Severinus of Noricum, who was the patron saint of the medieval colony Turnu, initially a suffragane of the Diocese of Kalocsa.

Turnu
The name of Turnu ("Tower") refers to a tower on the north bank of the Danube built by the Byzantines. Thus, the name of the city would mean "Northern Tower".

In other languages
Foreign names include Hungarian Szörényvár or Szörénytornya, Bulgarian Турну Северин and Serbian Дробета-Турн Северин/Drobeta-Turn Severin.

Geography and climate 
It is situated in western Oltenia, at the edge of the Topolnița depression, 220 km south-east of Timișoara, 113 km west of Craiova and 353 km west of Bucharest.

The region's climate gives Severin warm summers and mild winters, meaning the city is home to magnolia trees, Caucasian nut trees, and ginkgo biloba as well as the almond trees, figs, lilacs, lindens, and chestnut trees more common throughout Europe. The climate in the region can be classified as a "sub-Mediterranean climate".

History

The first written document, mentioning the city 1,870 years earlier, was commemorated in 1992.

Dacian and Roman times
Drobeta was a Dacian town the mentioned by Greek geographer Ptolemy of Alexandria (2nd century AD).

The Romans kept the name after building a castra at the site. The tower which supplied the Turnu part of the city's name stood on a small hill surrounded by a deep moat. Near Turnu Severin are the remains of the celebrated Trajan's Bridge, the largest in the Empire. Here, the Danube is about 1,200 metres (4,000 feet) broad. Built in only three years (AD 103–105) by the famous architect Apollodorus of Damascus, the bridge was considered the most daring work in the Roman world. The bridge was built on 20 pillars of stone blocks, was 1135 m long, 14.55 m wide and 18.60 m high. Each bridge head had its own portal monument, whose remains can still be seen on both sides of the Danube. Oaks from 200 hectares of forest were used for the wooden parts of the construction. The bridge was composed of twenty arches supported by stone pillars. Only two of them are still visible at low water.

Drobeta became, from a strategic perspective, a town at the crossing of land and water roads which led to the north and south of the Danube. It became the first urban center in the region and the third of Dacia after Sarmizegetusa and Apullum. During the reign of Emperor Hadrian (AD 117–138), the settlement was declared a city in 121. At this point the population had reached 14,000. During the reign of Septimius Severus (193–211), the city was raised to the rank of a colony (193), which gave its residents equal rights with citizens of Rome. As a colony, Drobeta was a thriving city with temples, a basilica, a theater, a forum, a port and guilds of craftsmen. In the middle of the 3rd century, Drobeta covered an area of 60 hectares and had a population of almost 40,000 inhabitants.

After the retreat of the Roman administration from Dacia in the 4th century, the city was preserved under Roman occupation as a bridge head on the north bank of the Danube until the 6th century. Destroyed by Huns in the 5th century, it was rebuilt by Justinian I (527-565).

Middle Ages
The fortress of Severin was built by the Kingdom of Hungary under Ladislaus I (1077–1095) as a strategical point against the Second Bulgarian Empire. Along with the forming of the Vallachian Voivodeships (Voievodatele Valahe), the Severin fortress was a reason for a war over a period of several generations between Oltenian Voievodes (Litovoi, Bărbat, then Basarab I) and Hungarians. The war ended with the Battle of Posada. Romanians then fought the Ottoman Empire, which threatened the area of the Danube. In this context, castles on the banks of the river, the area from Iron Gates to Calafat, began to be restored.

When the Hungarians attacked Oltenia and conquered Severin's fortress, Andrew II of Hungary organized the Banate of Severin. The first Ban of Severin, Luca, was mentioned in 1233. This year may be taken as the date of birth of a new castle over the ruins of Drobeta, under the name Severin (Severinopolis). It was a basis for the Banate of Severin, Terra Zeurino (Țara Severinului – Country of Severin). Severin's name was taken in memory of Severinus of Noricum, who was the patron saint of the medieval colony Turnu, initially a suffragane of the Diocese of Kalocsa.

In 1247, the Hungarian Kingdom brought the Knights of St. John to the country, giving them Severin as a residence, where they built the medieval castle of Severin (this is the Castrul Zeurini mentioned in Diploma of the Joannites in 1247). Inside the strong fort a Gothic church was erected. This was presumably the headquarters of the Catholic episcopate of Severin that was there until 1502. The knights withdrew in 1259, while the fortress remained in the range of the cannons of Turks, Bulgarians and Tatars who wanted to cross the Danube. The Hungarians still wanted to attack Oltenia.

Severin Fortress was the most important strategic redoubt on the Danube. Its conquest meant to gain an important bridgehead in the region.

Romanian Voivodes have also fought for this powerful fortress, conquering it or claiming it from time to time. Litovoi and Basarab I died at this fortress. Mircea the Elder (Mircea cel Bătrân) established Bănia Severinului (Banate of Severin) and, in 1406, concluded a treaty of alliance with Sigismund of Hungary right in Severin. After the death of Mircea, Sigismund freed the Severin Fortress occupied by the Turks, and even made some concessions to the monasteries of Vodița and Tismana. Then Banate of Severin returned to John Hunyadi, who consolidated all the castles on the Danube. Around 1432, possession passed to the Wallachian voivodes.

After the fall of Constantinople in 1453, attacks on the Danubian fortresses were made, moving the Banate residence to Strehaia. Later in Craiova, the Severin population migrating to Cerneți village at 6 km north, which became the capital of the Mehedinți district. In 1524, after a devastating attack by the Turks led by Suleiman the Magnificent, Litovoi only one tower of the fortress Severin was left standing, which led to the appointment of the Mehedinți people by Turnul lui Severin (Tower of Severinus). Then it was seized by the Ottoman Empire in 1524. Under Ottoman occupation, the territory's administration moved to the west of Oltenia and was centered in Cerneţi. In 1936, Prof. Dr. Al. Bărăcilă executed excavations at the fortress, where he managed to reconstruct the layout of the castle and recovered rich archaeological materials (rails, iron, copper, stone cannonballs, pipe of a bronze cannon etc.). The fortress was rectangular shaped with two walls made of unprocessed river stones, glued with mortar. In the center of the castle there was a chapel, surrounded by graves, built in part with materials taken from Drobeta Castrum. Also in the fortress was an oven-hearth serving a weapons workshop. Inside the interior, to the north, was a tower with three floors used for defense; to the east a second tower, thicker, at the angle of the wall. The entrance to the castle was through a gate dome and the fortress was surrounded by a deep moat. Severin was under Ottoman rule until 1829 except Wallachian occupation between 1594 and 1599 and Austrian one between 1718 and 1738.

For nearly 300 years the fortress was rebuilt after each battle to defend Wallachia against the Hungarians and Turks. Former Drobeta was reborn. Later, monuments from the Ancient Age embedded in the walls of new fortresses were discovered. Two Christian churches, Catholic and Eastern Orthodox, coexisted during these three centuries.

Modern times

After gaining freedom from Ottoman control as a consequence of the Treaty of Adrianople in 1829, it was decided to rebuild the present city. A rigorous program started in 1836. It was followed, in 1858, by the construction of the harbor. By 1900 the national road, rail, the Carol and Elisabeta boulevards, Navigația Fluvială Românească (River Navigation of Romania), the railway workshops, the shipyard (which in 1914 was the largest in the country), the Roman Hall, the Municipal Palace, three churches and two hospitals were built. In 1883, on May 15, Theodor Costescu established Traian High School, which in the next century would become a modern school of national prestige. The building of industrial factories spurred the development of the city. In 1841, Severin became the capital of the county and in 1851 became a city. As a major port on the Danube, the freedom of trade facilitated the entry of goods by boat from Vienna and the exchange of material necessary for economic development. Severin experienced a steady economic, urban and social growth until 1972, when it received the name of Drobeta-Turnu Severin.

In 1914, the Water Castle (Castelul de Apă) was opened. Considered an emblematic monument to the people of Severin, it gives identity to the city by being built in one of the major traffic roundabouts of the settlement.

In the inter-war period, the city of Turnu Severin managed to be placed among the eighteen largest urban centers in all of Romania. The city became a metropolis of culture by the initiatives of the Traian High School and institutions that reside in the imposing halls of the Palace of Culture: library, museum, theater, cinema, choral ensemble "Doina", "Lumina" Society, and Free University. These institutions continued during the communist regime. In the latter period, building was less in central neighborhoods, with the specific architecture of the city surviving the countrywide campaugn of demolitions unleashed by the Ceauşescu regime.

Among the most remarkable buildings of this period were - Hotel "Parc" residence SHN "Iron Gates", the Administration Palace, Youth House, shop "Decebal", House of Trade Unions and kinetic fountain in front of the Cultural Palace. In 1968, Turnu Severin became the capital of the county, concurrently becoming a city ("municipiu"). In 1972, the name of the ancient Drobeta was added to the city's name, and it became Drobeta-Turnu Severin.

Population (1859–2011)

Notable natives

Gallery

See also
 Iron Gates Region Museum
 Iron Gate I Hydroelectric Power Station

References

External links 

 Catholic Encyclopedia- Rumania
 Drobeta-Turnu Severin - Defineste-ti orasul

 
Capitals of Romanian counties
Cities in Romania
Localities in Oltenia
Planned cities in Romania
Populated places in Mehedinți County
Populated places on the Danube
Port cities and towns in Romania
Roman towns and cities in Romania